Shubhada Sharad Gogate, born 2 September 1943 as Pushpa Ranade, is a Marathi author from Maharashtra, India.

Biography
Shubhada Gogate is the daughter of Dinkar Damodar Ranade and Sarojini Dinkar Ranade of Nasik. As a child, she was a voracious reader of Marathi- and English-language  books, magazines and circulars, and wrote many short stories. She completed her B.Sc. in chemistry in Nasik in 1962 and worked as a school teacher for a few years. 

She married Sharad Gogate in 1966, who was in the book-selling field and later published books. As a bookseller and publisher’s wife with a keen interest in her husband’s work, she soon learned the trade of making and selling books.

Gogate began writing professionally in 1981 and her first novel Yantrayani was published in 1983. It was published first in two parts in the monthly magazine Naval, then later in book form.  This novel went on to win the government of Maharashtra’s award for best novel in the science-fiction category.

Gogate's novel Khandalyachya Ghatasaathi, a historical novel based on the construction and then extension of the first railway line in India, was published in 1992. This was a very different genre her previous work, involving a great deal of research into the historical information. It went on to win the Best Novel award from Marathi Sahitya Parishad as well as the Mrinmayi puraskar given by the well-known Marathi writer G.N. Dandekar.

In 1993, Gogate's story "Birthright" was included in the science fiction anthology It Happened Tomorrow, published by the National Book Trust of India.  The book included 19 stories that were translated into English from various Indian languages.

Noteworthy works

Science Fiction 
 Yantrayani (Novel)
 Marginals (Collection of short stories)
 Vasudeve Nela Krushna (Collection of short stories)
 Asmani (Collection of short stories)

Historical Novels 
 Khandalyachya Ghatasaathi - based on first railway line in India
 Sandha Badaltana – based on the first railway line in a princely state in India – Badoda.

Paranormal 
 Ghar (Collection of short stories)

Non Fiction works 
 Hriday vikar Nivaran
 Niramay Yashasathi Dhyaan

References 

1943 births
Living people
Marathi-language writers